The men's shot put event at the 2019 European Athletics Indoor Championships was held on 1 March at 11:30 (qualification) and at 20:35 (final) local time.

Medalists

Records

Results

Qualification

Qualification: Qualifying performance 20.90 (Q) or at least 8 best performers (q) advance to the Final

Final

References

2019 European Athletics Indoor Championships
Shot put at the European Athletics Indoor Championships